Robert Allen Iger (born February 10, 1951) is an American businessman and media executive who currently serves as the Chief Executive Officer (CEO) of The Walt Disney Company. He previously served as the President of ABC between 1994 and 1995 and the President and Chief Operating Officer (COO) of Capital Cities/ABC, from 1995 until its acquisition by Disney in 1996. Iger was named President of Disney in 2000 and succeeded Michael Eisner as CEO in 2005, until his contract expired in 2020. He then served as Executive Chairman until his retirement from the company in 2021. At the request of Disney's Board of Directors, Iger returned to Disney as CEO on November 20, 2022, following the unscheduled and immediate dismissal of his appointed successor, Bob Chapek. 

During his initial 15-year stewardship of the company, Iger broadened Disney's roster of intellectual properties, expanded its presence in international markets, and oversaw an increase of the company's market capitalization from $48 billion to $257 billion. He led the major acquisitions of Pixar in 2006 for $7.4 billion, Marvel Entertainment in 2009 for $4 billion, Lucasfilm in 2012 for $4.06 billion, and the entertainment assets of 21st Century Fox in 2019 for $71.3 billion. Iger also expanded the company's theme park resorts presence in East Asia, with the introduction of Hong Kong Disneyland Resort and Shanghai Disney Resort in 2005 and 2016, respectively. Additionally, he was also the driving force behind the reinvigoration of Walt Disney Animation Studios, the branded-release strategy of its film studio's output, and the company's increased investment on its direct-to-consumer businesses, including Disney+ and Hulu. As CEO, Iger is awarded approximately $27 million in annual target compensation, including a $1 million salary, a $1 million target bonus and $25 million in incentive based performance pay. Iger is widely regarded as one of the most powerful, pragmatic and effective leaders in the media industry.

Early life and education
Robert Iger was born to a Jewish family in New York City. He is the oldest son of Mimi (née Tunick) (1927–2013) and Arthur L. Iger (1926–2010). His father was a World War II Navy veteran who served as the executive vice president and general manager of the Greenvale Marketing Corporation, and was also a professor of advertising and public relations; he also played the trumpet and had bipolar disorder. His mother worked at Boardman Junior High School in Oceanside, New York. Arthur's father Joe (i.e. Bob's paternal grandfather) was cartoonist Jerry Iger's brother.

He was raised in Oceanside, where he attended the Fulton Avenue School and graduated from Oceanside High School in 1969. Iger developed a love of books from a young age. In 1973, he graduated magna cum laude from the Roy H. Park School of Communications at Ithaca College with a Bachelor of Science degree in Television and Radio.

Career
Iger began his media career in 1972 as the host of Campus Probe, an Ithaca College television show. He dreamed of becoming a news anchor while he worked as a weatherman in Ithaca for five months, before shifting his career goals.

American Broadcasting Company (ABC)

In 1974, Iger joined the American Broadcasting Company (ABC). His first job was performing menial labor on television sets for $150 a week (over $700, adjusted for inflation).

In 1988, Iger served as the senior program executive for the Calgary Winter Olympics. The event was marred by disruptive weather and delayed events, and to fill the broadcast schedule Iger's team focused on human interest stories such as those of the Jamaican bobsled team and Eddie the Eagle. The event achieved record-high ratings for ABC, and Iger's performance under pressure caught the attention of ABC executives Daniel Burke and Thomas Murphy, who subsequently championed Iger throughout his ascent at ABC.

In 1989, he was named head of ABC Entertainment, green lighting shows such as Twin Peaks, America's Funniest Home Videos  and Cop Rock. He served as president of the ABC Network Television Group from January 1993 to 1994, and was appointed as Capital Cities/ABC senior vice president in March 1993 and executive vice president in July 1993. In 1994, Iger was named president and chief operating officer of ABC's corporate parent, Capital Cities/ABC.

The Walt Disney Company
In 1995, The Walt Disney Company purchased Capital Cities/ABC and renamed it ABC, Inc., where Iger remained chairman until 1999. 

On February 25, 1999, Disney named Iger the president of Walt Disney International, the business unit that oversees Disney's international operations, as well as chairman of the ABC Group, removing him from day-to-day authority at ABC. Disney called the change a promotion for Iger.

Disney named Iger the president and chief operating officer (COO) on January 24, 2000, making him Disney's No. 2 executive under chairman and CEO, Michael Eisner. Disney had been without a separate president since Eisner assumed the role following the departure of Michael Ovitz in 1997, after sixteen months at Disney.

In 2005 board members Roy E. Disney and Stanley Gold began a campaign called "save Disney" against Eisner. As a result, Disney began a search for the next CEO to replace Eisner. On March 13, 2005, Disney announced that Iger would succeed Michael Eisner as CEO, and Iger was placed in charge of day-to-day operations, though Eisner held the title of CEO until he resigned on September 30, 2005. In July 2005, Disney and Gold dropped the campaign and agreed to work with Iger.

One of Iger's first major decisions as CEO was to reassign Disney's chief strategic officer, Peter Murphy, and disband the company's Strategic Planning division. It was around this time Iger started to become known as "Bob" rather than "Robert". 

On January 24, 2006, under Iger's leadership, Disney announced it would acquire Pixar for $7.4 billion in an all-stock transaction. In the same year, Iger also re-acquired the rights to Walt Disney's first star, Oswald the Lucky Rabbit, from NBCUniversal by releasing sportscaster Al Michaels from ABC Sports to NBC Sports.

Also in 2006, Roy E. Disney issued this statement regarding Iger:

Animation has always been the heart and soul of The Walt Disney Company, and it is wonderful to see Bob Iger and the company embrace that heritage by bringing the outstanding animation talent of the Pixar team back into the fold. This clearly solidifies The Walt Disney Company's position as the dominant leader in motion picture animation and we applaud and support Bob Iger's vision.

In August 2009, Iger spearheaded negotiations that led Disney to acquire Marvel Entertainment and its associated assets for $4 billion. By 2014, Disney had grossed more than that amount at the box office through the Marvel movies. On October 7, 2011, Disney announced that Iger would become chairman of the board, following John Pepper's retirement from the board in March 2012. On November 15, 2011, Apple, Inc., led by CEO Tim Cook, named Iger to its board of directors. Iger was responsible for making Steve Jobs Disney's largest shareholder by its acquisition of Pixar.

In October 2012, Iger signed a deal with filmmaker George Lucas to purchase Lucasfilm for $4 billion following several months of negotiations. As a result, Disney acquired the rights to the Star Wars multimedia franchise and Indiana Jones. (In December 2022, Iger was reported to have defined the word franchise as “something that creates value across multiple businesses and across multiple territories over a long period of time.”) Following its release on December 18, 2015, Star Wars: The Force Awakens grossed over $2 billion at the box office. In March 2016, Iger announced that the $5.5 billion Shanghai Disney Resort would open its doors on June 16, 2016. In May 2016, Iger wrote in a Facebook post claiming that Disney has hired 11,000 new employees in the past decade at Disneyland, and 18,000 in the past 5 years in the U.S. Iger specifically targeted Vermont Senator, Bernie Sanders, asking him how much he has contributed to job growth.

In November 2017, Variety reported that Iger knew about a 2010 Oscar party where Pixar chief John Lasseter was seen "making out with a junior staffer", seeming to confirm anonymous allegations that Lasseter's inappropriate interactions with young women had been known to company leadership since the 1990s. One anonymous source was quoted as saying, "I know personally that Bob was aware. ... Everybody was aware. They just didn't do anything about it."

Iger's contract as Disney's chairman and CEO was originally planned to run until June 30, 2018; however, in March 2017, Disney announced that it was extending Iger's term to July 2, 2019, and said he would serve as a consultant for the following three years. In December 2017, Disney extended Iger's contract through 2021.

In July 2018, under Iger's leadership, Disney and 21st Century Fox shareholders approved a deal to allow Disney to purchase Fox assets. The deal was finalized in March 2019.

In April 2019, it was announced that Iger would depart from his position as CEO and chairman of Disney when his contract expired in 2021. Iger resigned from Apple's board of directors on September 10, 2019, in order to avoid a conflict of interest as Disney and Apple prepared to launch competing streaming services Disney+ and Apple TV+.

In September 2019, Iger released his New York Times Best Seller, The Ride of a Lifetime, which includes Iger's years-long efforts to open Shanghai Disneyland Park; he traveled to China 40 times over 18 years for the project.

In 2020, Iger announced his intention to retire. On February 25 that year, the board of directors named Bob Chapek – then-chairman of Disney Parks, Experiences and Products – the new chief executive, while appointing Iger executive chairman (an ad hoc post) to oversee the transition. In April however, the board unexpectedly extended Iger's mandate until the end of 2021, so he could guide Chapek and the company's senior management through the early COVID-19 pandemic. On December 31, 2021, Iger stepped down completely and was succeeded by Susan Arnold as chair of the board.

However, on November 20, 2022, Iger replaced Chapek, reprising as the CEO. Iger agreed to hold the post for two years while looking for a successor that will lead the company.

Company boards 
In October 2020, he became a director of the massively-funded dairy-replacement startup Perfect Day.

Iger joined the board of Genies, Inc. in March 2022.

Personal life
Iger has been married twice. His first marriage to Kathleen Susan Iger ended in divorce. They have two daughters. In 1995, Iger married journalist Willow Bay in an interfaith Jewish and Roman Catholic service in Bridgehampton, New York. They have two children: Robert Maxwell "Max" Iger (born 1998) and William Iger (born 2002).

Iger has been noted for his kindness by David Geffen, who said: "I have never heard one person say a bad thing about him and I have never seen him be mean".

In January 2021, he donated $5 million to aid small businesses struggling because of the coronavirus pandemic.

According to Forbes, Iger's estimated net worth was about $690 million as of 2019.

Politics
Iger has described himself as a political centrist, while he has publicly identified with the Democratic Party. Iger co-chaired a fundraiser for Hillary Clinton's presidential campaign on August 22, 2016. He was named to President-elect Trump's Strategic and Policy Forum on December 2, 2016. He resigned from the Forum on June 1, 2017 out of protest after President Trump withdrew the United States from the Paris Climate Agreement.

In 2016, Iger switched his party registration from Democratic to independent (no party affiliation).

Iger serves as an advisor on the COVID-19 Technology Task Force, a technology industry coalition founded in March 2020 collaborating on solutions to respond to and recover from the COVID-19 pandemic.

Iger considered running for president as a Democrat in the 2020 election, however ultimately decided against running. In a 2022 interview, Iger described his decision not to run as influenced by a combination of factors, including his family's resistance to the idea, his belief that a moderate businessman would be an unpopular candidate within the party, and the fact that Disney was acquiring 21st Century Fox around the same time.

Accolades and recognition
In June 2012, Steven Spielberg, noted director and founder of the USC Shoah Foundation Institute for Visual History and Education, presented Iger with the Ambassador for Humanity Award. Iger was recognized for his support of the institute's work, his longtime philanthropy, and his leadership role in corporate citizenship. Iger was presented with The Milestone Award from the Producers Guild of America (PGA) in 2014. The award is the PGA's highest recognition for an individual or team who has made contributions to entertainment.

In May 2015, Iger was named to the 25th Annual Broadcasting & Cable Hall of Fame. In October 2015, the Toy Industry Association (TIA) inducted Iger into the Toy Industry Hall of Fame. He was selected by members of TIA in recognition of his contributions to the industry, and the impact his work has had on the lives of children worldwide.

In December 2019, Iger was named by Time as their Businessperson of the Year. In 2020, he was inducted into the Television Hall of Fame.

In May 2021, Iger delivered the commencement address at The University of Texas at Austin.

In September 2022, Iger was appointed an Honorary Knight Commander of the Order of the British Empire (KBE) by Queen Elizabeth II "for services to the UK/US relations"; the knighthood was one of the final two awarded during the Queen's seventy-year reign.

Bibliography

References

External links

 Corporate biography
 

1951 births
20th-century American businesspeople
21st-century American businesspeople
American Broadcasting Company executives
American chairpersons of corporations
American chief executives
American chief operating officers
20th-century American Jews
American media executives
American memoirists
American people of Jewish descent
Businesspeople from New York (state)
Chairmen of The Walt Disney Company
Directors of Apple Inc.
Directors of The Walt Disney Company
Disney executives
Fellows of the American Academy of Arts and Sciences
Ithaca College alumni
Honorary Knights Commander of the Order of the British Empire
Living people
New York (state) Democrats
New York (state) Independents
People from Oceanside, New York
Presidents of American Broadcasting Company Entertainment
Presidents of the American Broadcasting Company
21st-century American Jews
Businesspeople awarded knighthoods